Ano Kotradis was a town of ancient Cilicia, inhabited in Roman and Byzantine times. 

Its site is located near Ballık, Asiatic Turkey.

References

Populated places in ancient Cilicia
Former populated places in Turkey
Roman towns and cities in Turkey
Populated places of the Byzantine Empire
History of Karaman Province